The coulomb (symbol: C) is a unit of electric charge, named after French physicist Charles-Augustin de Coulomb

Coulomb may also refer to:

People 
 Charles-Augustin de Coulomb (1736–1806), French physicist and namesake of the term coulomb
 Coulomb's law, a law of physics first published by Coulomb in 1785
 List of things named after Charles-Augustin de Coulomb
 A family of French naval architects
 François Coulomb the Elder   (1654–1717)
 François Coulomb the Younger (1691–1751)
 Joseph-Marie-Blaise Coulomb, (1728–1803)
 Adrien Coulomb (born 1990), French professional footballer
 Jean Coulomb (1904–1999), French mathematician, geophysicist and scientific administrator

Places 
 Coulomb (crater), a lunar crater named after the French physicist
 Saint-Coulomb, a French commune

Other 
 Coulomb (submarine), a Brumaire-class submarine of the French Navy
 COULOMB, a high-energy physics experiment at CERN that ran from 1979 to 1995
 Coulomb Affair, a theosophical conflict in the 1870s
 Coulomb Technologies, former name of electric vehicle infrastructure company ChargePoint
Coulomb stress transfer, a concept used to study how earthquakes influence hazard on other faults.

See also 
 Coulombs (disambiguation)
 Coulombe, a surname
 Colombo (surname)

French-language surnames